The Bliha is a river in Bosnia and Herzegovina. It is a left tributary of the Sana river, located in region of Bosanska Krajina, on Sanski Most municipality territory and town vicinity.

Bliha Falls

The Bliha Falls (or ), called by locals Blihin Skok ( or ), is a waterfall on the Bliha river located near Fajtovci, 14 kilometers west of Sanski Most, Bosnia and Herzegovina. The 56 meters high waterfall is designated a natural monument since 1965.

See also
 List of rivers of Bosnia and Herzegovina

References

Natural monuments
Rivers of Bosnia and Herzegovina
Tributaries of the Sana (river)